Nothing to Lose is an album released under the name of "Forty Deuce" which is a band formed by guitarist/vocalist Richie Kotzen.

Track listing

Personnel
Richie Kotzen – vocals, guitar
Taka Tamada – rhythm guitar
Ari Baron – bass
Thr3e – drums
Alex Todorov – engineering, mixing

References

2005 albums